A fire alarm system warns people when smoke, fire, carbon monoxide, or other fire-related or general notification emergencies are detected. These alarms may be activated automatically from smoke detectors and heat detectors or may also be activated via manual fire alarm activation devices such as manual call points or pull stations.

Design 
After the fire protection is established—usually by referencing the minimum levels of protection mandated by the appropriate model building code, insurance agencies, and other authorities—the fire alarm designer undertakes to detail specific components, arrangements, and interfaces necessary to accomplish these goals. Equipment specifically manufactured for these purposes is selected and standardized installation methods are anticipated during the design.

 ISO 7240-14 is the international standard for the Design, installation, commissioning, and service of fire detection and fire alarm system in and around the building. this standard was published in August 2013; Status, Published; Edition 1; Technical Committee ISO/TC 21/SC 3 Fire detection and Alarm system.
 NFPA 72, The National Fire Alarm Code is an established and widely used installation standard from the United States. In Canada, the ULC is the standard for the fire system. 
Last version 2019; Status, Published. This code is part of a family standard NFPA
 TS 54 -14 is a Technical Specification (CEN/TS) for Fire detection and fire alarm system - Part 14: Guidelines for planning, design, installation, commissioning, use, and maintenance. This document has been prepared by Technical Committee CEN/TC72, This document is part of the EN 54 series of standards. This standard was published in October 2018; Status, Published.
There are national codes in each European country for planning, design, installation, commissioning, use, and maintenance of fire detection systems with additional requirements that are mentioned on TS 54 -14
 Germany, Vds 2095
 Italy, UNI 9795
 France NF S61-936
 Spain UNE 23007-14
 United Kingdom BS 5839 Part 1

Parts

 Fire alarm control panel (FACP), or fire alarm control unit (FACU): This component, the hub of the system, monitors inputs and system integrity, controls outputs, and transmits information.
 Primary power supply: Commonly the non-switched 120 or 240-volt alternating current source is supplied by a commercial power utility. In non-residential applications, a branch circuit is dedicated to the fire alarm system and its constituents. "Dedicated branch circuits" should not be confused with "Individual branch circuits" which supply energy to a single appliance.
 Secondary (backup) power supplies: This component, commonly consisting of sealed lead-acid storage batteries or other emergency sources including generators, is used to supply energy in the event of a primary power failure. The batteries can be either inside the bottom of the panel or inside a separate battery box installed near the panel.
 Initiating devices: These components act as inputs to the fire alarm control unit and are either manually or automatically activated. Examples would be devices such as pull stations, heat detectors, duct detectors, and smoke detectors. Heat and smoke detectors have different categories of both kinds. Some categories are beam, photoelectric, ionization, aspiration, and duct.
 Fire alarm notification appliance: This component uses energy supplied from the fire alarm system or other stored energy source, to inform the proximate persons of the need to take action, usually to evacuate. This is done using pulsing incandescent light, flashing strobe light, electromechanical horn, siren, electronic horn, chime, bell, speaker, or a combination of these devices. Strobes are either made of xenon tubes (most common) or recently LEDs.
 Building safety interfaces: This interface allows the fire alarm system to control aspects of the built environment, prepare the building for fire, and control the spread of smoke fumes and fire by influencing air movement, lighting, process control, human transport, and availability of exits.

Initiating devices 

 Manually actuated devices; also known as fire alarm boxes, manual pull stations, or simply pull stations, break glass stations, and (in Europe) call points. Devices for manual fire alarm activation are installed to be readily located (near the exits), identified, and operated. They are usually actuated by means of physical interaction, such as pulling a lever or breaking glass.
 Automatically actuated devices can take many forms intended to respond to any number of detectable physical changes associated with fire: convected thermal energy for a heat detector, products of combustion for a smoke detector, radiant energy for a flame detector, combustion gases for a fire gas detector, and operation of sprinklers for a water-flow detector. The newest innovations can use cameras and computer algorithms to analyze the visible effects of fire and movement in applications inappropriate for or hostile to other detection methods

Notification appliances 

Alarms can be either motorized bells or wall-mountable sounders/horns. They can also be speaker strobes that sound an alarm, followed by a voice evacuation message for clearer instructions on what to do. Fire alarm sounders can be set to certain frequencies and different tones including low, medium, and high, depending on the country and manufacturer of the device. Most fire alarm systems in Europe sound like a siren with alternating frequencies. Fire alarm electronic devices are known as horns in the United States and Canada and can be either continuous or set to different codes. Fire alarm warning devices can also be set to different volume levels.

 Notification Appliances utilize audible, visible, tactile, textual or even olfactory stimuli (odorizer) to alert the occupants of the need to evacuate or take action in the event of a fire or other emergency. Evacuation signals may consist of simple appliances that transmit uncoded information, coded appliances that transmit a predetermined pattern, and or  appliances that transmit audible and visible textual information such as live or prerecorded instructions, and illuminated message displays. Some Notification appliances are combined fire alarm/general emergency notification appliances, allowing both fire and general emergency notification from a single device.
 In the United States, fire alarm evacuation signals generally consist of a standardized audible tone, with visual notification in all public and common-use areas. Emergency signals are intended to be distinct and understandable to avoid confusion with other signals.
As per NFPA 72, 18.4.2 (2010 Edition)Temporal Code 3 is the standard audible notification in a modern system. It consists of a repeated three-pulse cycle (0.5 s on, 0.5 s off, 0.5 s on, 0.5 s off, 0.5 s on, 1.5 s off). Voice Evacuation is the second most common audible in a modern system. Legacy systems, typically found in older schools and buildings, have used continuous tones alongside other audible schemas. 
In the United Kingdom, fire alarm evacuation signals generally consist of a two-tone siren with visual notification in all public and common-use areas. Some fire alarm devices have an alert signal which is generally used for schools for lesson changes, the start of morning break, the end of morning break, the start of lunch break, the end of lunch break, and when the school day is over.
 Audible textual appliances, that are employed as part of a fire alarm system that includes Emergency Voice Alarm Communications (EVAC) capabilities. High-reliability speakers are used to notify the occupants of the need for action in connection with a fire or other emergency. These speakers are employed in large facilities where general undirected evacuation is considered impracticable or undesirable. The signals from the speakers are used to direct the occupant's response. The system may be controlled from one or more locations within the building known as Fire Wardens Stations or from a single location designated as the building Fire Command Center. Speakers are automatically actuated by the fire alarm system in a fire event, and following a pre-alert tone, selected groups of speakers may transmit one or more prerecorded messages directing the occupants to safety. These messages may be repeated in one or more languages. Trained personnel activating and speaking into a dedicated microphone can suppress the replay of automated messages to initiate or relay real-time voice instructions.

Emergency voice alarm communication systems 
 Some fire alarm systems utilize emergency voice alarm communication systems (EVAC) to provide prerecorded and manual voice messages. Voice alarm systems are typically used in high-rise buildings, arenas, and other large "defend-in-place" occupancies such as hospitals and detention facilities where total evacuation is difficult to achieve.
 Voice-based systems provide response personnel with the ability to conduct orderly evacuation and notify building occupants of changing event circumstances.
 In highrise buildings, different evacuation messages may be played on each floor, depending on the location of the fire. The floor the fire is on along with ones above it may be told to evacuate while floors much lower may simply be asked to stand by.

Mass notification systems/Emergency communication systems 
 New codes and standards introduced around 2010 especially the new UL Standard 2572, the US Department of Defense's UFC 4-021-01 Design and O&M Mass Notification Systems, and NFPA 72 2010 edition Chapter 24 have led fire alarm system manufacturers to expand their systems voice evacuation capabilities to support new requirements for mass notification including support for multiple types of emergency messaging (i.e., inclement weather emergency, security alerts, amber alerts). The major requirements of a mass notification system are to provide prioritized messaging according to the local facilities' emergency response plan. The emergency response team must define the priority of potential emergency events at the site and the fire alarm system must be able to support the promotion and demotion of notifications based on this emergency response plan. Emergency Communication Systems also have requirements for visible notification in coordination with any audible notification activities to meet requirements of the Americans with Disabilities Act. Many manufacturers have made efforts to certify their equipment to meet these new and emerging standards. Mass notification system categories include the following:
 Tier 1 systems are in-building and provide the highest level of survivability
 Tier 2 systems are out of the building and provide the middle level of survivability
 Tier 3 systems are "At Your Side" and provide the lowest level of survivability

Mass notification systems often extend the notification appliances of a standard fire alarm system to include PC-based workstations, text-based digital signage, and a variety of remote notification options including email, text message, RSS feed, or IVR-based telephone text-to-speech messaging.

Building safety interfaces 

 Magnetic smoke door holders/retainers: wall-mounted solenoids or electromagnets controlled by a fire alarm system or detection component that magnetically secures spring-loaded self-closing smoke-tight doors in the open position. Designed to demagnetize to allow automatic closure of the door on command from the fire control or upon failure of the power source, interconnection, or controlling element. Stored energy in the form of a spring or gravity can then close the door to restrict the passage of smoke from one space to another in an effort to maintain a tenable atmosphere on either side of the door during evacuation and fire fighting efforts in buildings. Electromagnetic fire door holders can be hard-wired into the fire panel, radio-controlled triggered by radio waves from a central controller connected to a fire panel, or, acoustic, which learns the sound of the fire alarm and release the door upon hearing this exact sound.
 Duct-mounted smoke detection: smoke detection mounted in such a manner as to sample the airflow through ductwork and other plenums specifically fabricated for the transport of environmental air into conditioned spaces. Interconnection to the fan motor control circuits is intended to stop air movement, close dampers and generally prevent the recirculation of toxic smoke and fumes produced by fire into occupiable spaces.
 Emergency elevator service: activation of automatic initiating devices associated with elevator operation is used to initiate emergency elevator functions, such as the recall of associated elevator cab(s). The recall will cause the elevator cabs to return to the ground level for use by fire service response teams and to ensure that cabs do not return to the floor of fire incidence, in addition, to prevent people from becoming trapped in the elevators. Phases of operation include primary recall (typically the ground level), alternate/secondary recall (typically a floor adjacent to the ground level—used when the initiation occurred on the primary level), illumination of the "fire hat" indicator when an alarm occurs in the elevator hoistway or associated control room, and in some cases shunt trip (disconnect) of elevator power (generally used where the control room or hoistway is protected by fire sprinklers).
 Public address rack (PAR): an audio public address rack shall be interfaced with a fire alarm system, by adding a signaling control relay module to either the rack power supply unit, or the main amplifier driving this rack. The purpose is to "mute" the BGM (background music) of this rack in case of an emergency in case of a fire initiating the true alarm.

British fire alarm system categories 
Fire alarm systems in non-domestic premises are generally designed and installed in accordance with the guidance given in BS 5839 Part 1. There are many types of fire alarm systems each suited to different building types and applications. A fire alarm system can vary dramatically in both price and complexity, from a single panel with a detector and sounder in a small commercial property to an addressable fire alarm system in a multi-occupancy building.

BS 5839 Part 1 categorizes fire alarm systems as:

 "M" manual system (no automatic fire detectors so the building is fitted with call points and sounders).
 "L" automatic systems intended for the protection of life.
 "P" automatic systems intended for the protection of property.

Categories for automatic systems are further subdivided into L1 to L5 and P1 to P2.

Zoning 
An important consideration when designing fire alarms is that of individual zones. The following recommendations are found in BS 5839 Part 1:

 A single zone should not exceed  in floor space.
 Where the floor space exceeds  then all zones should be restricted to a single floor level.
 Stairwells, lift shafts or other vertical shafts (nonstop risers) within a single fire compartment should be considered as one or more separate zones.
 The maximum distance traveled within a zone to locate the fire should not exceed .
Also, the NFPA recommends placing a list for reference near the FACP showing the devices contained in each zone.

See also 

Fire Safety Equivalency System
Multiple-alarm fire
National Fire Protection Association
Smoke detector
Fire drill
False alarm
EN 54 – European Standard for Fire detection
Emergency population warning - a way to warn people through audible and visual devices when peoples lives are in danger.

References

External links 

 Example Specification Section 283100 Fire Alarm Systems
 Authoritative guide to fire alarm systems in UK
 NFPA Standards

 
American inventions